Sovietskyi (until 1944, İçki) is an urban-type settlement in the Autonomous Republic of Crimea, a territory recognized by a majority of countries as part of Ukraine and incorporated by Russia as the Republic of Crimea. The town also serves as the administrative center of the Sovietskyi Raion (district), housing the district's local administration buildings.

As of the 2001 Ukrainian Census, its population is 10,963. Current population:

Education 

 College of Hydraulic Land Reclamation and Agricultural Mechanization (Branch), Crimean Federal University

References

Urban-type settlements in Crimea
Sovietskyi Raion